Matthew "Matt" J. Freeman is the protagonist of Anthony Horowitz's The Power of Five novels Raven's Gate and Evil Star, and one of the main characters in Necropolis and Oblivion.  He also briefly appeared in the third book of the series, Nightrise. He was born in London, England, to an English mother and a father from New Zealand. However, after the death of his parents he went to live in Ipswich, then York.

He is 14 years old at the start of the series but turns 15 in Necropolis and is destined to become the leader of "The Five". He is described as having short dark hair, blue eyes, broad shoulders and a muscular body, like a model or footballer.

Early life 
Matthew Freeman spent the primary years of his life growing up with his kind and loving parents, Mark and Kate Freeman, in Dulwich. They were of comfortable financial stature, though they were not very rich. On the morning of the wedding of a family friend, Matt claimed he was ill (when really what had happened was that he had had a premonition of his parents' death, and did not want to go with them, later regretting not trying to save them from their death) and was left with a neighbour, Rosemary Green, while his parents went. Matt reveals to the disbelieving neighbour the details of an accident in which his parents are killed. Afterwards, a police officer arrived and informs them that his parents' car has toppled off a bridge and that both his parents are dead. Mrs. Green is sick with shock.

Orphaned, Matt was fostered by his Aunt Gwenda and her partner, Brian, who spent his inheritance on luxuries. They then started to abuse and neglect Matt when the money ran out. Gwenda and Brian were in an abusive relationship. His performance at school suffered accordingly and he soon fell under the influence of a local thug, Kelvin Johnson, who encouraged him to take to stealing, truancy, vandalism, smoking and petty crime. According to Matt himself, he started smoking at the age of twelve, stole things from local shops, and broke and entered.

Raven's Gate
Matthew found out about Raven's Gate, and his true destiny, when Tom Burgess, a farmer in the Yorkshire town of Greater Malling, was murdered and had smeared the letters in green paint across the wooden door in the bedroom of the farmhouse he lived in. After a botched warehouse theft which culminated in the stabbing of a security guard, Matt is placed on the Leaf project(Liberty and Education Achieved through Fostering). He is placed in the care of Jayne Deverill, an old lady living in Lesser Malling, a village in Yorkshire. Taking an immediate disliking to her, Matt tries to escape several times but does not succeed, due to some supernatural power acting in the area. After spending three days in a fever, hearing people talk about him in a sinister fashion, and seeing an odd ritual going on in the remains of an abandoned nuclear power plant, he encounters Richard Cole, a local journalist. Matt attempts to explain but Cole does not believe him and leaves him back on his own. However, Richard and Matt later reunite after Richard rescues Matt from a bog.

After speaking with the nuclear plant's creator and two members from a shadowy organization known as the Nexus, Matt realized that he was one of five Gatekeepers, reincarnated after ten thousand years.  In the past, mankind fought a final battle with The Old Ones, extradimensional demons who oppressed, slaughtered and imprisoned civilization. Before Matt could ask further questions, he is captured, dragged inside the power plant and tied upon an altar with a cross of Jesus Christ hanging above him upside down. Matt finds that he is going to be sacrificed with a sacrificial knife as his blood in satanic rituals, and a nuclear explosion will be used to open the gate. Richard Cole is going to be burnt to death. However, before the Old Ones can escape Raven's Gate, Matt managed to trigger his power and stop the knife from going through his heart. The vacuum created by the subsequent nuclear explosion sucks the Old Ones back in along with the villagers. Before the explosion, a furious Mrs. Deverill chases Matt and Richard downstairs into a power plant room with an acid pool. Mrs Deverill manages to knock Richard out, and she and Matt have a fight which ends in Mrs. Deverill attempting to crush Matt's windpipe with an extremely heavy pole.  Before this can occur, however, Richard awakes and pushed Mrs. Deverill into the pool of acid. After this incident, Matt begins living with Richard, supported by The Nexus.

Evil Star
Several weeks later, Matt attends a private school, Forest Hill, financed by The Nexus, and was attacked by his apparently possessed aunt Gwenda Davis, who blew up a petrol tanker to try to kill him, after murdering her husband, Brian Conran, with a kitchen knife. Matt was constantly bullied at the school due to his background, forcing him to unwillingly use his powers of telekinesis when he unknowingly attacked the bully, and then he knew he couldn't stay at the school as he could well be a danger to the other students with his overwhelming powers. He used his powers once again to save the entire school from being eradicated when his possessed aunt Gwenda Davis tried to blow up the school via a petrol tanker, and then the Nexus recruited him once again in order to prevent Diego Salamanda from opening the second gate, built into the Nazca plains. Matt travelled to Peru and was meant to be collected by Fabian, one of The Nexus, but was instead collected by Fabian's manservant, who was ambushed via taking Matt and Richard Cole to the hotel.

Upon hiding from the ambushers, Matt discovered a boy of his age known only as Pedro, who later turned out to be another reincarnated Gatekeeper. Matt decided to go to the hotel after all but was ambushed by the Peruvian police force, led by Captain Rodriguez, who viciously attacked him. Escaping with some cracked ribs, Matt managed to travel to Pedro's home, where he learned of Pedro's past and the situation of the poor Peruvians. Matthew was sent, with Pedro, to travel to Cuzco, where they would find aid. Eventually they gained the friendship of the local Incas, and traveled to the city of the Incas, where Matt found Richard Cole, who had been kidnapped by the Incas prior to Matt's travels. Matt journeyed upland where he meets Professor Joanna Chambers and learned the location of the second gate, and also he learned that Salamanda had a base in the desert. He, Richard, the Incas and Pedro attacked the base, disarming the headquarters and attempting to disarm the satellite which Salamanda was using to awaken the Old Ones. It was during this battle that Richard and Matt realized that the traitor in the Nexus was actually Fabian, who was an author in Salamanda's employment (as Salamanda was his publisher).

Since their plan to stop the satellite had failed, Matt travelled to Salamanda's main base of operations, in the desert. Although he killed Salamanda, the great gate, hidden in the Nazca Desert, unlocked. However, he manage to wound them severely using his powers. The Old Ones triumphed and walked upon the Earth once again, meaning they could conquer Hong Kong and hurl Matt into a coma, as displayed in Evil Star and Nightrise. They defeat Matt and leave him to die. However, Richard and Chambers arrive. Matt is about to die, but Pedro releases his power, faith healing, at the last minute and revives Matt.

Nightrise
Matt only makes two very brief appearances in Nightrise: once in a flashback when he was left to die in the desert and Richard Cole rescues him, and again at the end of the book when he and Pedro meet Jamie and Scott Tyler at Professor Chambers's hacienda. His past self also appears in Nightrise when Jamie is sent back into the past, at approximately 8000 BC.

Necropolis
Matt was first seen in Necropolis, when he was reading a newspaper article about a girl called Scarlett Adams who had been missing for a day after walking through a door in Saint Meredith's Church in London, England. This is the same church and door that Matt walked through in Evil Star, and as only the five Gatekeepers can travel through that door (with one companion each), and 24 other doors around the world that take them around the world. Matt knows that Scarlett is the fifth and final Gatekeeper.

Matt has now turned fifteen years old and is still living with Joanna Chambers, Richard Cole, Jamie & Scott Tyler and Pedro in Peru. Now that he knows Scarlett is in London he sets out to find her with Jamie and Richard, leaving Scott and Pedro back in Peru. However before this happens and whilst Matt and the others are still in Peru, they are visited by a man named Ramon who claims to have worked for Salamanda before, but know nothing about him working for the Old Ones. Ramon also brought St Joseph of Cordoba's diary which contains information that the Gatekeepers need about the doors, Old Ones and the gates. Then zombies attack the house, killing Ramon, attacking the first four Gatekeepers, the professor and Richard and setting the house on fire. Later, Professor Chambers dies because of the attack and Matt, Jamie and Richard finally go to London to find Scarlett. Pedro and Scott go back to Vilcabamba to stay safe.

They arrive to find out by Scarlett's housekeeper that Scarlett's father has rushed her to Hong Kong on apparent "urgent business". Matt is very disappointed by this news and he, Jamie and Richard have a meeting with the Nexus where Matt finally discovers the Old Ones' plan. The Old Ones have trapped Scarlett in Hong Kong, China in hope of luring Matt there too by using Scarlett as the bait. It is then discovered that the Old Ones want the Gatekeepers to have the diary, so that they can discover where the doors around the world are, and as there is one in Hong Kong the Old Ones hope the Gatekeepers will go through the door where the Old Ones will capture them all and torture them, whilst the Old Ones take over the world. It is then revealed that Scarlett's father works for Nightrise and so will give Scarlett to the Old Ones.

With no other choice Matt, Richard and Jamie head to Hong Kong to rescue Scarlett but not via the door as a member of the Nexus reveals he has a friend in Macau who can take them to Hong Kong via boat. When Matt, Jamie and Richard arrive in Hong Kong they are separated when the Nightrise corporation attack the boat they are in. Matt is forced to walk the streets alone, in the streets is a thick smog that smothers Hong Kong and suffocates its residents, later killing them. This is the Old One's plan to turn Hong Kong into a necropolis, a city of the dead. Matt sees people dead or dying on Hong Kong's streets. He even sees some of the creatures that broke out of the Nazca Lines, such as a horse with a knife struck through its head like an evil unicorn.

Matt then remembers what the Nexus told him about where Scarlett's father lives, an apartment building called Wisdom Court and decides to visit him. Matt discovers that Scarlett's father, Paul, is worried sick about Scarlett. The next morning The Chairman of the Nightrise corporation kills Paul, captures Matt and takes him to where Scarlett is being held hostage: Victoria Prison. The pair meet and exchange stories whilst a heavy storm begins in Hong Kong, but it is no coincidence. Scarlett's power is to control the weather and she has accidentally caused a huge typhoon in Hong Kong. Lohan Shan-tung (a Triad gangster sent to help Scarlett), Richard, Jamie and two of Lohan's men break Scarlett and Matt out of the prison they are being held captive in. Matt and Scarlett then discover the typhoon which is destroying Hong Kong.

Scarlett then manages to protect her and the others with her powers and they finally reach a temple with the magic door in, which can take them safely back to Peru and the five can be re-united. The temple is protected from the typhoon whilst Scarlett is inside. As they reach the door, Scarlett is shot by a Nightrise agent, leading the temple to collapse because Scarlett can't protect it from the typhoon while she's unconscious. Scott and Jamie rush through at the last minute. The Gatekeepers, Richard and Lohan (Scarlett in Richard's arms) dash through the door before they are killed by the storm.

It is then revealed that as the Gatekeepers had no decided destination they have all been scattered all over the world. It is also revealed that Hong Kong has been completely destroyed by the typhoon but the smog was wiped away. Necropolis then ends leaving readers on a cliffhanger.

Oblivion
In Oblivion, it is revealed that Matt has ended up in Brazil alongside Lohan. To make money and survive, Lohan "sells" Matt on the slave market, taking the money and later rescuing Matt. Matt, unsure what to do, decides to return to the library in the dream world and read the book of his life. Though he is horrified at when the future is revealed to him, he then accepts his fate and summons the other Gatekeepers in the dream world. He tells them all to meet him in Oblivion, the Antarctic stronghold of the Old Ones.

Anticipating Scott's betrayal, Matt briefly speaks with him. Eventually, Matt and Lohan are captured when they attempt to sell each other and are sent to work in the Serre Morte gold mine. They later escape and Matt convinces Lohan to fly them to Antarctica where a human rebellion known as the World Army is heading. Matt takes part in an attack on Oblivion, even though he previously warned the leader of the World Army not to go ahead with it, foreseeing their defeat at the hands of the Old Ones.

After retreating, Matt receives a note from Scott asking Matt to meet with him. Despite knowing that Scott will betray him, Matt insists on going. Although Richard Cole and Scarlett eventually accompanies him, Matt and Richard are both captured. The Old Ones reveal that they will keep Matt alive but torture him for the rest of his life as revenge for wounding Chaos in Nazca. As the Old Ones prepare to kill Richard in front of Matt, but Richard finally realizes the purpose of the sacrificial tumi knife given to him by the Incans, and stabs Matt in the heart so his past incarnation can complete the Five.

Scott then feels guilty after his actions and Matt's sacrifice. Scott finally realises that he has been nothing but a pawn in the hands of the Old Ones and thus breaks the seal on the Gateways (sacrificing himself in the process) as a final act of repentance.

At the same time as Matt's death, his past incarnation is summoned to the present along with Flint, and the five Gatekeepers reunite to defeat the Old Ones. With all traces of the Old Ones gone, Richard and the others bury Matt's body next to Scott's. Matt's past incarnation explains the Gatekeepers are no longer needed as the new Gate will hold indefinitely this time and the five Gatekeepers disappear into the dream world which is no longer desolate and empty, but now full of life and colour.

Although it was Matt's past incarnation that went forth into the dream world, the ending chapter hints that he is now one with his future self, as he sees the Gatekeepers' "mother" in the dream world exactly as the present day Matt saw her in her wedding dress all those years ago.

Past Matt
In his past life, Matt was the leader of the Gatekeepers. He alone had knowledge of the Old Ones and how to defeat them, though the source of this knowledge has not been revealed so far (though it is possibly that, like his future incarnation, he read the book of his life in the dreamworld's Library). Unlike the other Gatekeepers of that period, Matt was referred to by his modern name, saying "he likes that one better". In the fifth book Richard Cole notices that this Matt often seems deep in thought, but was powerful enough to make the seas part and split the sky.

Each of the five may have been gods and goddesses except for Matt, though he may well have been Jesus. This is highly likely as Pedro's past life, Inti, was the Incan Sun God, Scar's past life was Lin Mo, the Chinese goddess of the sea, and in Jamie and Scott's past lives, they were the Iroquois gods, Sapling and Flint. The four of them represent South America, Asia, and North America, respectively, with Matt representing Europe.

Powers and abilities
Matt is a member of the Gatekeepers, and is a very advanced telekinetic. Matt does not have full control over his abilities and it is stated it can only work under massive desperation. When he uses his powers he sees his kitchen the morning his parents die. However, by the fourth book, Necropolis, he has learned to use his abilities on command as he has teamed up with three of the other four Gatekeepers. In Oblivion, his power are suggested to have increased enormously, being able to crack and push apart an Antarctic ice shelf by himself.

It is mentioned that his powers work through his belief in them. This is how he climbed the sword ladder in Necropolis. He can manipulate almost any object with his mind and was able to create energy blasts while fighting the Old Ones in Peru.

He is a skilled clairvoyant, getting dreams and day-dreams that show him the future, although the future he sees is the outcome of decisions. This means that what he sees can be changed by doing something to prevent it. His past self is a highly advanced warrior and leader, commanding absolute loyalty from his followers. According to fellow past Gatekeeper, Scar, "there's not a single man alive who wouldn't give his life for Matt."

References

External links
 The Power of Five
 Raven's Gate at Walker Books Excellent English
 The Power of Five Page at AnthonyHorowitz.com

Characters in British novels of the 21st century
Fictional characters with precognition
Fictional English people
Fictional telekinetics
Literary characters introduced in 2005
Male characters in literature
Orphan characters in literature
Teenage characters in literature